Callinectes exasperatus (common name: rugose swimming crab) is a species of swimming crab. They can be found in the western Atlantic Ocean. The diet of this species is carrion. They are not commercially fished.

References

External links
 Callinectes exasperatus info

Portunoidea
Crustaceans of the Atlantic Ocean
Arthropods of the Dominican Republic
Crustaceans described in 1856